Moradluy-e Sofla (also Romanized as Morādlūy-e Soflá; also known as Morādlū-ye Soflá) is a village in Zangebar Rural District, in the Central District of Poldasht County, West Azerbaijan Province, Iran. At the 2006 census, its population was 283, in 62 families.

References 

Populated places in Poldasht County